Stomatepia is a genus of cichlids endemic to Lake Barombi Mbo in western Cameroon. Although generally recognized as distinct, the genus is very close to Sarotherodon.  The Stomatepia species are all recognized as critically endangered by the IUCN because of pollution and sedimentation due to human activities. They are potentially also threatened by large emissions of carbon dioxide (CO2) from the lake's bottom (compare Lake Nyos), although studies indicate that Barombo Mbo lacks excess amounts of this gas. Konia, Myaka and  Pungu are three other equally threatened genera of cichlids that also are endemic to Lake Barombi Mbo.

Species
There are currently three recognized species in this genus:
 Stomatepia mariae (Holly, 1930) (Nsess)
 Stomatepia mongo Trewavas,  1972 (Mongo)
 Stomatepia pindu Trewavas,  1972 (Pindu)

References

Endemic fauna of Cameroon
 
Oreochromini
Cichlid fish of Africa

Freshwater fish genera
Cichlid genera
Taxa named by Ethelwynn Trewavas
Taxonomy articles created by Polbot